Markéta Hajdu (born September 9, 1974) is a retired female hammer thrower from the Czech Republic. She set her personal best throw (65.91 metres) on June 2, 2001 at a meet in Prague, earning her a berth for the 2001 World Championships in Edmonton, Canada.

Achievements

References

1974 births
Living people
Czech female hammer throwers
21st-century Czech women